Respiratory Medicine is a monthly peer-reviewed medical journal published by Elsevier covering research in pulmonology.According to the Journal Citation Reports, Respiratory Medicine has a 2020 impact factor of 3.415.

References

External links 
 
 

Pulmonology journals
Publications established in 1907
Monthly journals
Elsevier academic journals
English-language journals